The , often abbreviated to , was a left-leaning union confederation. Founded in 1950, it was the largest labor federation in Japan for several decades.

Origins

In the immediate aftermath of Japan's defeat in World War II, the United States-led Allied Occupation of Japan issued directives legalizing labor unions, which were then protected by the new Constitution of Japan promulgated in 1947. In the early postwar years, numerous labor unions formed in industries throughout Japan, many of which were under the influence of the Japan Communist Party. However in 1950, following the advent of the global Cold War, and taking advantage of the sense of crisis precipitated by the sudden outbreak of the Korean War, conservative Japanese government and business leaders launched, with the tacit approval of US Occupation authorities, a "Red Purge" to remove communists and suspected communists from government and private-sector jobs. As part of the purge, Japanese conservatives fomented "democracy cells" within the established, Communist Party-dominated labor unions. As these unions collapsed amid the purge, the cells emerged and joined with some affiliates of the Japanese Federation of Labour to form a new labor federation, the General Council of Trade Unions of Japan, or Sōhyō.

Early militancy

Conservatives hoped that the new federation would be more moderate than the federations controlled by the Communist Party, which had been extremely militant. However, Sōhyō rapidly fell under the sway of the Japan Socialist Party and took the lead in organizing an escalating series of increasingly large and contentious labor actions over the course of the 1950s, and increasingly became involved in political protests as well.

On May 1, 1952, Sōhyō spearheaded a nationwide day of protest against the perceived one-sided nature of the Peace Treaty ending the Occupation of Japan. Although most of these activities were peaceful, a violent clash between protesters and police outside the Imperial Palace in Tokyo led to several deaths and injuries and became remembered as "Bloody May Day."

Over the rest of the 1950s, Sōhyō became actively involved in a number of political and social movements, including movements to ban nuclear weapons and against US military bases in Japan. It also led a large number of strikes for higher wages across many different industries. Sōhyō's period of militancy culminated in 1960 when it took a leading role in the massive Anpo protests against revision of the US Japan Security Treaty, as well as the large-scale strike at the Miike Coal Mine in northern Kyushu. As part of the anti-Security Treaty Struggle, Sōhyō organized a nationwide general strike that involved 6.4 million workers and remains the largest recorded strike in Japanese history. However, both these efforts ended in disastrous defeats, and thereafter Sōhyō increasingly retreated from contentious strikes in favor of more moderate workplace actions.

Merger to form Rengo

A large portion of Sōhyō merged with the more conservative Japanese Confederation of Labor (Domei) and other unions to form Rengo in 1987. Rengo was formally launched in 1989. Some elements of Sōhyō instead joined one of two new federations: the National Confederation of Trade Unions (Zenroren), and the National Trade Union Council (Zenrokyo).

Affiliates
The following unions were affiliated:

Leadership

Presidents
1950: Takeo Muto
1953: Totaro Fujita
1956: Yukitaka Haraguchi
1958: Ōta Kaoru
1966: Toshikatsu Horii
1970: Makoto Ichikawa
1978: Motofumi Makieda
1983: Takeshi Kurokawa

General Secretaries
1950: Zengoro Shimagami
1951: Minoru Takano
1955: Akira Iwai
1970: Shogo Oki
1976: Mitsuo Tomizuka
1983: Eikichi Makoto

See also

 Labor unions in Japan
 Valery Burati

References

External links
 Kyoto Sohyo

National trade union centers of Japan
Progressivism in Japan
Trade unions established in 1950
Trade unions disestablished in 1989